Asterodiaspis is a genus of true bugs belonging to the family Asterolecaniidae. Secies of this genus are found in Europe, North America,  and Australia.

Species
The following species are recognised in the genus Asterodiaspis:

Asterodiaspis bella 
Asterodiaspis ilicicola 
Asterodiaspis mina 
Asterodiaspis quercicola 
Asterodiaspis repugnans 
Asterodiaspis roboris 
Asterodiaspis suishae 
Asterodiaspis variolosa 
Asterodiaspis viennae

References

Asterolecaniidae